Lee Anthony Mavers (born 2 August 1962) is an English musician. Mavers was the songwriter, singer and rhythm guitarist in The La's and is best known for the song "There She Goes" from October 1988.

Mavers was originally the bassist for the Liverpool group Neuklon circa 1980 to 1984.

Mavers is a passionate supporter of Everton Football Club and regularly attends Goodison Park.

He is the older brother of actor Gary Mavers and Neil Mavers who was the drummer for The La's.

The La's
Mavers gained a reputation for perfectionism and eccentricity. Obsessing over the group's troubled recording efforts between 1987 and 1992, Mavers eventually retreated back to his Liverpool home after the release of the La's' eponymous debut album, his perception of the music industry soured by the fact the release was not a version of the album he wished to be made public.

More silence in the music press followed, barring one 1995 NME interview. Mavers was at this point occasionally playing with other Liverpool musicians. Mavers disavowed the album in print while struggling to maintain his artistic integrity.

In late 2003 a book about Mavers and his band was released, In Search of the La's: A Secret Liverpool which contained a 2000 dated interview with Mavers discussing his band and what he intends to do with his music. While providing insight into Mavers' personality, the book ends on an ambiguous note concerning his return to music.

In March 2005 the La's announced dates in Britain and Ireland, their first in a decade, along with festivals sets such as Glastonbury and the Summer Sonic festival in Japan, with the line-up of Lee Mavers (vocals, guitar), John Power (bass), Jay Lewis of the band Cracatilla (guitar) and Nick Miniski (drums). The set generally consisted of old songs, including the perennial favourite "There She Goes", with new songs performed as encores. The drummer was quickly replaced by Mavers' old schoolfriend Ian Jasper, and live reviews have generally been favourable. New songs that would have featured, or will feature, on the 2nd album include "I Am the Key", "Fishing Net" A.K.A. "Something I Said", "Raindance" and "The Human Race".

In March 2009, Mavers made a surprise appearance in Birmingham, joining Pete Doherty on stage to play "Son of a Gun" and "There She Goes".

On 19 June 2011, Mavers made a rare outing, doing a secret acoustic set at the Deaf Institute, Manchester under the name of Lee Rude & the Velcro Underpants (a play on Lou Reed and The Velvet Underground): this featured Mavers playing with Gary Murphy of defunct Liverpool band the Bandits. Mavers and Murphy continued impromptu gigs in Sunderland, Glasgow and London, before heading abroad to Amsterdam and later to the Rock En Seine Festival in Paris and at UK festivals Kendal Calling and Bestival, before bringing the 'stripped back' sets to a close at a homecoming show at Liverpool's O2 Academy after announcing they were set to return soon after recruiting a full band.

An interview with Mavers also appears in the 2013 music interview book, Isle of Noises: Conversations with Great British Songwriters, by Daniel Rachel. Within the interview, Mavers discussed the themes of certain songs and his songwriting craft (essentially describing himself as a conduit rather than author), again decried the sole album released by The La's, and also explained he has a "great patience" for the music to happen.

References

External links
 
Neuklon era photo of Mavers

1962 births
Alumni of the University of Central Lancashire
English male guitarists
English rock guitarists
English rock singers
English male singer-songwriters
The La's members
Living people
People from Huyton
Musicians from Liverpool